Evolution is the debut studio album by the Italian Italo disco band Scotch. It was released in 1985.

Track listing

Charts

References

External links 

 

1984 debut albums
Scotch (band) albums